Stratiomys chamaeleon, the clubbed general, is a European species of soldier fly.

Distribution
It has a widespread Palearctic distribution, occurring in Southern Europe and parts of Asia. It has a very restricted range in Britain, where it is regarded as endangered.

Ecology
In Britain larvae have been found in tufa-rich flush systems. Elsewhere larvae of Stratiomys chamaeleon have been recorded from the margins of freshwater ponds and spring pools as well as from semi saline conditions. Adults are on the wing from late June to the middle of August, with peak occurring in mid to late July and feed on nectar, mostly from umbellifers.

References

Stratiomyidae
Diptera of Europe
Insects described in 1758
Palearctic insects
Taxa named by Carl Linnaeus